Les espaces inquiets (French: Worried spaces) is the fifth album by Art Zoyd, released in 1983 through Cryonic Inc. In 1989, Les espaces inquiets would be re-issued as a double compact disc with Phase IV and Archives 2.

Track listing

Personnel 
Art Zoyd
Patricia Dallio – electric piano, piano
Gérard Hourbette – viola, violin, synthesizer, percussion
Didier Pietton – alto saxophone, tenor saxophone, percussion
Jean-Pierre Soarez – trumpet, flugelhorn, percussion
Thierry Zaboitzeff – bass guitar, cello, guitar, vocals, tape, synthesizer
Production and additional personnel
Art Zoyd – production, mixing, recording
Unsafe Graphics – photography, design
Robert Vogel – mixing, recording

References

External links 
 

1983 albums
Art Zoyd albums